The Sheng Kung Girls' High School is an all-girl junior and senior high school located in North District, Tainan, Taiwan. It was founded in Tienjin, China, by the Catholic Sheng Kung Concent, and moved to its present location in 1964.

Statistics 
Total students 2600 girls.
Age range 11–18, (grades 7–11)
Staff numbers 50 full-time, 10 part-time
Principal Ms Julliana Jen

History 
It was founded as an elementary school in 1914 in the former French Protectorate of Tien Jing.

See also
 Education in Taiwan

External links

School Homepage
 

1914 establishments in China
Educational institutions established in 1914
Girls' schools in Taiwan
High schools in Taiwan
Schools in Tainan